Church of the Ascension was a wooden Orthodox church in the village of Lukianivka, Brovary Raion, Kyiv Oblast, Ukraine.

In 1758, the first church was built in the village. During 1879, the present church was built opposite the old one. The old church was soon dismantled, but the site remained undeveloped. The church was closed in 1930. Worship services were resumed in the church during the German occupation in 1941, and the church had not been closed since. The church belonged to the Boryspil Eparchy of the Ukrainian Orthodox Church.

On 25 March 2022, after the village, after being occupied for a while by the Russian army during the 2022 Russian invasion of Ukraine, was retaken by the Ukrainian Armed Forces, it was discovered that the Russians destroyed the church. According to the priest, "at 4 o'clock in the morning, a Russian tank destroyed this church with four shots."

References 

1879 establishments in the Russian Empire
2022 disestablishments in Ukraine
Attacks on churches in Europe
Buildings and structures in Kyiv Oblast
Wooden churches in Ukraine
Ukrainian Orthodox Church (Moscow Patriarchate) church buildings
Buildings and structures destroyed during the 2022 Russian invasion of Ukraine
Demolished churches in Ukraine